The 1975 Race of Champions was a non-championship Formula One race held at Brands Hatch on 16 March 1975. Weather conditions were inhospitable, with strong winds, heavy rain and even snow showers during the weekend. 

There was some pre-race controversy about the decision to top up the grid with Formula 5000 cars-eventually a compromise was reached where only those drivers with Formula 1 experience would be permitted to start.

Ironically the most vehement protester against the Formula 5000 drivers, Emerson Fittipaldi, qualified only 17th, some four rows behind the fastest Formula 5000 driver Tom Belsø.

Roelof Wunderink made his début in the Ensign, whilst Tony Trimmer qualified well in the new Safir car (previously known as a Token) and Maurizio Flammini was a non-starter after crashing heavily in practice.

Tom Pryce dominated in appalling weather conditions from Jody Scheckter, giving the crowd a home driver to cheer in the absence of James Hunt.

The start was delayed as snow fell and teams had to quickly decide which type of tyres to use, but when the flag fell, Jacky Ickx surged through from the second row to lead. In midfield, Belso was hit and spun taking out Jochen Mass, who retired despite having minimal damage to the car. As a result of this incident, the decision was taken to bar Formula 5000 cars from future Formula 1 races.

Scheckter took the lead at the end of lap 1 on dry tyres and Pryce was soon catching him, having passed Ronnie Peterson and Ickx after a bad start on the damp side of the track.

In second place, with a strong home following was John Watson in the Surtees who gained the place having taken Peterson when they were passing backmarkers at Druids Bend.

Despite not being a Championship round, Pryce's win makes this the only Formula One race won by a Welshman.

Results

References 

http://www.silhouet.com/motorsport/archive/f1/nc/1975/1975.html#roc
1976 John Player Grand Prix Year Book, Autocourse 1975

External links

Race of Champions (Brands Hatch)
Race of Champions
Formula 5000 race reports
Race of Champions
Gold
Race of Champions